Kunwar Pushpendra Singh Chandel is an Indian politician serving as a Member of Parliament in the 17th Lok Sabha from Hamirpur in Uttar Pradesh, from where he was elected for two consecutive terms. He is a member of Bharatiya Janata Party.

Personal life
Chandel was born in Mahoba, Uttar Pradesh on 8 October 1973 to Kunwar Harpal Singh Chandel and Sheel Singh Chandel. His educational qualifications include M.A. (Political Science) and LL.B. He received his education from Bundelkhand University and Allahabad university . Pushpendra married Deepali Singh on 18 February 1999, with whom he has two sons.

Political career
 May 2014: Elected to 16th Lok Sabha
 1 September 2014 onwards: Member, Standing Committee on Railways; Member, Consultative Committee, Ministry of Agriculture
 2 August 2016 onwards: Member, Joint Committee on Offices of Profit
 1 September 2017 - 25 May 2019: Member, Standing Committee on Finance
 May 2019: Re-elected to the 17th Lok Sabha
 13 September 2019 onwards: Member, Standing Committee on External Affairs
 9 October 2019 onwards: Member, Rules Committee and Member, Consultative Committee, Ministry of Defence

References

Living people
India MPs 2014–2019
People from Hamirpur district, Uttar Pradesh
Lok Sabha members from Uttar Pradesh
Bharatiya Janata Party politicians from Uttar Pradesh
1973 births
People from Mahoba
India MPs 2019–present
Bundelkhand University alumni